Wrestling was one of the events at the 1974 Asian Games held in Aryamehr Indoor Stadium, Tehran, Iran between 8 and 13 September 1974.

Medalists

Freestyle

Greco-Roman

Medal table

Participating nations
A total of 113 athletes from 11 nations competed in wrestling at the 1974 Asian Games:

References
1974 Asian Games result

External links
UWW Database

 
1974 Asian Games events
1974
Asian Games
1974 Asian Games